Emery Row is a historic building in Covington, Kentucky, United States, that is listed on the National Register of Historic Places.  It is an example of design attributable to the regionally significant architect Samuel Hannaford, of Cincinnati, and illustrates the Queen Anne style architecture in the United States as executed in multiple-family housing units.

The housing units are situated on portions of Lots 24 and 25 of the Western Baptist Theological Sub-Division (later known as Old Seminary Square Historic District), in Covington.  The lots were purchased in 1841 by John Taylor, who sold them post Civil War to  Charles Reeves and John Mackoy. In mid-1879, the lots were acquired by Thomas J. and Joseph J. Emery, believed to be the sons of Cincinnati industrialist, Thomas Emery.

A number of prominent Covington citizens lived in these residences including Thomas H. Kennedy, the city's civil engineer and descendant of Thomas Kennedy whose  farm became the original town of  Covington in the early 19th century.

References

National Register of Historic Places in Kenton County, Kentucky
Houses in Kenton County, Kentucky
Houses on the National Register of Historic Places in Kentucky
Buildings and structures in Covington, Kentucky
1880 establishments in Kentucky
Houses completed in 1880
Queen Anne architecture in Kentucky